John Henry Driscoll (1876 – 1921), also known by the nickname of "Hockey", was a Welsh rugby union, and professional rugby league footballer who played in the 1890s and 1900s. He played club level rugby union (RU) for Cardiff RFC as a three-quarter or half-back, and club level rugby league (RL) for Hull FC (Heritage № 64)

Background
Driscoll was born in Cardiff, Wales, his wife Louisa was proprietor of a dining and tearooms in Cardiff , his father Patrick Driscoll was born in Skibbereen, County Cork, Ireland.

Rugby union career
Driscoll joined Cardiff RFC during the 1895–96 season, playing as a half-back. He gained a place in the first team during his initial season and scored 9 tries. Driscoll was not as prolific the following season, with just five tries to his name; but during the 1897–98 season he was switched to the wing. This saw Driscoll becoming the club's fourth highest try scorer with a tally of 16, playing in 30 of the 31 first team games. Cardiff Rugby Club historian D. E. Davies described Driscoll that season as, "our excellent uncapped wing". Having been overlooked by the Wales (RU), the next season Driscoll switched codes to professional rugby league with Hull FC, alongside former Cardiff half-back Tom Savage.

Nickname
Hockey Driscoll's nickname of "Hockey" was a corruption of Hawkeye, and pronounced Ockey, as he would prefer to ankle tap tackle, rather than body tackle, which demanded both a quick-eye (Hawkeye), and fast reactions to see and catch the opposition player's foot.

References

External links
 Search "Driscoll" at rugbyleagueproject.org

(archived by web.archive.org) Statistics at hullfc.com
(archived by web.archive.org) Stats → Past Players → D at hullfc.com (statistics for player surnames beginning with 'C' and 'D' swapped)
 Some famous Footballers of the Cardiff Rugby Club.
(archived by web.archive.org) Cardiff RFC Season Review 1895 - 1896
(archived by web.archive.org) Cardiff RFC Season Review 1896 - 1897
(archived by web.archive.org) Cardiff RFC Season Review 1897 - 1898
Search for "Hockey Driscoll" at britishnewspaperarchive.co.uk

1876 births
1921 deaths
Cardiff RFC players
Expatriate rugby league players in England
Footballers who switched code
Hull F.C. players
Rugby league players from Cardiff
Rugby union halfbacks
Rugby union three-quarters
Rugby union players from Cardiff
Welsh expatriate rugby league players
Welsh rugby league players
Welsh rugby union players